Tang Renjian (born August 1962) is a Chinese politician formerly serving as Governor of Gansu province. He formerly served as deputy director of the Office of the Leading Group for Financial and Economic Affairs, the Vice Chairman of the Guangxi Zhuang Autonomous Region.

Biography
Tang Renjian was born in August 1962 in Chongqing. In March 1983, he graduated from the Southwestern University of Finance and Economics. Later he entered the Ministry of Agriculture, became the officer. In 1998, he moved to the Office of the Leading Group for Financial and Economic Affairs, became the supervisor.

In 2014, Tang was appointed as the Vice Chairman of Guangxi; in 2015, he was made Executive Vice Chairman. In 2016, he returned to the Office of the Leading Group for Financial and Economic Affairs, became the deputy director. He was appointed as the acting Governor of Gansu in 2017.

References 

1962 births
Living people
Chinese Communist Party politicians from Chongqing
People's Republic of China politicians from Chongqing
Members of the 19th Central Committee of the Chinese Communist Party
Delegates to the 13th National People's Congress
Ministers of Agriculture of the People's Republic of China
Political office-holders in Guangxi
Governors of Gansu
Politicians from Chongqing